Vidler is a surname. Notable people with the name include:

 Alec Vidler (1889–1991), English theological writer
 Bob Vidler (born 1957), Australian cricketer
 Ivor Vidler (1909–1976), Australian public servant
 Jack Vidler (1905–1953), English footballer
 John Vidler (1890–1967), English cricketer and prison governor
 Ken Vidler (born 1954), Australian sprint canoer
 Melina Vidler (born 1993), Australian actress
 Steven Vidler (actor) (born 1960), Australian actor
 Steven Vidler (judoka) (born 1977), Scottish judoka
 William Vidler (1758–1816), English nonconformist minister and editor